Ramakrishna Pillai Ramachandran Nair (born 23 April 1939) is a retired Indian Administrative Service officer, who served as collector of Kannur and Kollam districts, managing director of Travancore-Cochin Chemicals, secretary to various departments, and Chief Secretary of Kerala state in different intervals. He was also the founding Vice Chancellor of Sri Sankaracharya University, Kalady. A prolific writer, he has also written many poems and essays in Sanskrit (under the pseudonym Thulaseevanam), Malayalam and English. His Sanskrit compositions, most of them being Carnatic kritis, praise more on the deities of Kerala temples, especially around Thiruvananthapuram and Kottayam. Nair is credited with popularising many temples in Kerala.

Early life 
Nair was born on the 10th of Medam 1115 (Kollam era), 23 April 1939, in Mangombil house (his ancesteal home) in Kottayam, as the fifth of the nine children of Thumbunkal Ramakrishna Pillai, a mathematics teacher by profession, and Mangombil Bharathi Amma. His ancestors originally hailed from Thirunavaya in the present-day Malappuram district, and migrated to Travancore following Tipu Sultan's invasion. He has seven brothers and a sister, among which one died at a very young age. He spent his childhood in Poonjar in the eastern side of Kottayam district. He was a brilliant student in his school, and passed SSLC with distinction in 1955. From a very young age itself, he learnt Sanskrit from noted scholars. After his education, he served as a teacher at University college in Thiruvananthapuram for a short time. He joined IAS in 1961.

Personal life 
Nair is married to Lakshmi R. Nair, daughter of late V. R. Pillai. Their marriage happened in 1965, when Nair was 26 and Lakshmi was 19. The couple has two sons and a daughter. The eldest son, Prof. R. Hemanth Kumar is the principal of Ettumanoorappan College, Ettumanoor, Kottayam district. The second son Dr. R. Ajay Kumar is a cardiologist by profession. The third child and only daughter, Anjali R. Mohan is a school teacher by profession in Chennai. Nair is a devotee of the noted Hindu saint and social reformer Chattambi Swamikal, and is a member of numerous organisations related to his ideologies.

As a writer 
Nair is well-known for Carnatic compositions, written under the pseudonym Thulaseevanam. His compositions usually feature the deities in Kerala temples, especially around Kottayam, his native place, and Thiruvananthapuram, where he finally settled. He is well-credited for popularising numerous temples in Kerala, like Pazhavangadi Ganapathi Temple, Sreekanteswaram Mahadeva Temple, Attukal Bhagavathi Temple, Kidangoor Subramanya Temple, Thirunakkara Mahadeva Temple, etc. He also wrote songs on Chattambi Swamikal, the noted social reformer of Kerala, whom he idolises most. Most of his songs were written in Sanskrit. Though he has immense poetic talent, he lacks musical proficiency, and thus he had to seek outside help for tuning his songs, just like Arunachala Kavirayar and Periyasamy Thooran. His songs have been composed and sung by numerous popular musicians like Maharajapuram Santhanam, T. V. Sankaranarayanan, T. N. Seshagopalan, R. K. Srikantan, Rajkumar Bharathi, Prince Rama Varma, Perumbavoor G. Raveendranath and numerous others. His most popular composition is Bhaja Manasa Vighneshwaram Anisham in the raga Bahudari.

Footnotes

1939 births
Living people
Indian Administrative Service officers
Indian writers